This is an incomplete list of television programs formerly or currently broadcast by History/H2 in the United States.

Current programming

Unscripted

Adam Eats the 80s
Alone
Alone: Frozen
Alone: The Skills Challenge
American Pickers
Ancient Aliens
The Bermuda Triangle: Into Cursed Waters
Beyond Oak Island
The Curse of Oak Island
The Fast History Of...
The Food That Built America
Forged in Fire
Fully Torqued
Hard Truths of Conservation
History's Crazy Rich Ancients
History's Greatest Mysteries
I Was There
Kings of Pain
Lost Gold of the Aztecs
Modern Marvels
More Power
Mountain Men
Mountain Men: Ultimate Marksman
Pawn Stars
Pawn Stars Do America
The Proof Is Out There
The Secret of Skinwalker Ranch
Secret Restoration
Swamp People
Swamp People: Serpent Invasion
The Toys That Built America
The UnXplained

Upcoming programming
Dirty Old Cars (January 18, 2023)
History's Greatest Heists with Pierce Brosnan (February 7, 2023)

In development

Scripted
The Donner Party
The Plague Year
Sitting Bull (4-Night Documentary)

Former programming

Scripted

Scripted Shows 

 Gangland Undercover
 Knightfall
 Project Blue Book
 Six
 Vikings

Miniseries 

Abraham Lincoln
Barbarians
The Bible
Grant
Hatfields & McCoys

The Men Who Built America
The Men Who Built America: Frontiersmen
Napoleon
The Revolution
Roots (2016 miniseries)
Sons of Liberty
Texas Rising
Theodore Roosevelt
Washington

Others 

Gadget Boy's Adventures in History
Inspector Gadget's Field Trip

Unscripted

Docuseries

Reality

Documentary Films 

10 Days That Unexpectedly Changed America
10 Things You Don't Know About
101 Fast Foods That Changed The World
101 Gadgets That Changed The World
101 Inventions That Changed The World
101 Objects That Changed The World
101 Things That Changed The World
102 Minutes That Changed America
12 Days That Shocked the World
1968 With Tom Brokaw
20th Century with Mike Wallace
60 Hours
70s Fever
9/11 Conspiracies: Fact or Fiction
9/11: The Days After
9/11: Escape From the Towers
9/11: The Final Minutes of Flight 93
9/11: Four Flights
9/11: Inside Air Force One
9/11: The Legacy
9/11: State of Emergency
Appalachian Outlaws
After Jackie
Alaska: Big America
Alaska: Dangerous Territory
Alaska Off-Road Warriors
Alcatraz: Search for the Truth
Alcatraz Escape: The Lost Evidence
Amelia Earhart: The Lost Evidence
America: The Story of Us
America Unearthed
American Daredevils
American Eats
American Eats: History on a Bun
The American Farm
The American Presidency with Bill Clinton
American Restoration
America's 9/11 Flag: Rise From the Ashes
America's Book of Secrets
America's Greatest Prison Breaks
Ancient Discoveries
Ancient Impossible
Ancient Mysteries
Ancients Behaving Badly
Andrew Jackson
Angels and Demons: Decoded
Ape to Man
Apocalypse Man
Apocalypse PA
Armageddon (TV series)
Around the World in 80 Ways
Assembly Required
Auschwitz Untold
Auto-Maniac
Automobiles
Ax Men
Back to the Blueprint
Banned from the Bible
Battle 360°
Battlefield Detectives
Battles BC
The Beatles On Record
Beltway Unbuckled
Ben Franklin
The Bible Code: Predicting Armageddon
Bible Secrets Revealed
Big Easy Motors
Big History
Big Shrimpin'
Black Blizzard
Black Patriots: Heroes of the Civil War
Black Patriots: Heroes of the Revolution
Blood Diamonds
Boneyard
Boys' Toys
Brad Meltzer's Decoded
Breaking Mysterious
Breaking Vegas
The Butcher
Cajun Pawn Stars
The Cars That Made America
The Century: America's Time
The Century of Warfare
Chasing Mummies'Christianity: The First Thousand YearsChristianity: The Second Thousand YearsCities of the UnderworldCivil War CombatCivil War JournalClash of the GodsCocaine: History Between the LinesCola WarsThe Cole ConspiracyColor of WarColumbus: The Lost VoyageComets: Prophets of DoomComic Book Superheroes UnmaskedCommand DecisionsThe ConquerorsConquestConquest of AmericaConspiracy?Countdown to Ground ZeroCounting CarsThe Crusades: Crescent and the CrossCowboys and OutlawsThe Curse of Civil War GoldCuster's Last Man (I Survived Little Bighorn)Da Vinci and the Code He Lived ByThe Dark AgesDay After DisasterThe Day the Towers FellDays That Shaped AmericaDead Men's SecretsDeath RoadDecisive BattlesDeclassifiedDecoding the PastDeep Sea DetectivesDigging for the TruthDinosaurs UnearthedDisasters of the CenturyA Distant Shore: African Americans of D-DayDogfightsDouble 'F'Down East DickeringEating HistoryEinsteinEngineering DisastersEngineering an EmpireEvolveExorcism: Driving Out the DevilExpedition AfricaExtreme History with Roger DaltreyExtreme MarksmenExtreme TrainsFabulous TreasuresFact to FilmFailure Is Not an OptionFDR: A Presidency RevealedFight the Power: The Movements That Changed AmericaFirst ApocalypseThe First Days of ChristianityFirst Invasion: The War of 1812First to Fight: The Black Tankers of WWIIFood TechThe Food That Built America Snack SizedFort Knox: Secrets RevealedFounding BrothersFounding FathersThe French RevolutionFull Metal JoustingFull ThrottleGanglandGates of HellGerald Ford: A Man and His MomentGettysburgGod, Guns & AutomobilesGod vs. SatanThe Godfather LegacyGods and GoddessesThe Great American History QuizGreat Crimes and TrialsGreat Military BlundersThe Great ShipsGrounded on 9/11Guts + BoltsHairy BikersHangar 1: The UFO FilesHarvest (TV series)Haunted HistoryThe Haunted History of Halloween Heavy MetalHerbert Bail BondsHeroes under FireHidden CitiesHidden House HistoryHigh HitlerHigh Points in HistoryHillbilly: The Real StoryHistory AliveHistory FilmsHistory in ColorHistory IQHistory NowHistory of AngelsA History of BritainA History of GodHistory of the JokeThe History of SexHistory RocksHistory UndercoverHistory vs. HollywoodHistory's BusinessHistory's Lost & FoundHistory's MysteriesHistory's Turning PointsHitler and Stalin: Roots of EvilHitler and the OccultHitler's FamilyHitler's GeneralsHitler's HenchmenHitler's WomenThe Holy GrailHome for the Holidays: The History of ThanksgivingHonor DeferredHooked: Illegal Drugs & How They Got That WayHotel Ground ZeroHoudini: Unlocking the MysteryHow Bruce Lee Changed the WorldHow the Earth Was MadeHow Life BeganHow the States Got Their ShapesHow William Shatner Changed the WorldHuman WeaponI Am Alive: Surviving the Andes Plane CrashI Love the 1880sIce Road TruckersIcons of PowerIn Search of...In Search of HistoryIncredible but True?Indiana Jones and the Ultimate QuestInside IslamInspector AmericaInvention USAInvestigating HistoryIron & FireIRT Deadliest RoadsIt's Good to be PresidentIt's How You Get ThereJeffersonJesus: The Lost 40 DaysJFK: 3 Shots That Changed AmericaJFK Assassination: The Definitive GuideJFK: A Presidency RevealedJourney to 10,000 BCJumbo MoviesJurassic Fight ClubThe Kennedy Assassination: 24 Hours AfterThe Kennedy Assassination: Beyond Conspiracy (Peter Jennings Reporting)Kennedys: The Curse of PowerKingThe Ku Klux Klan: A Secret HistoryThe Last Days of World War IILast Stand of the 300Lee and GrantLee Harvey Oswald: 48 Hours to LiveLegacy of Star WarsLiberty's KidsLife After PeopleThe Lincoln AssassinationLive From '69: Moon LandingLock N' Load with R. Lee ErmeyThe Long MarchThe Lost EvidenceThe Lost Kennedy Home MoviesLost Magic DecodedLost WorldsMadHouseMail CallMaking The 9/11 MemorialMaking a BuckMan, Moment, MachineMan vs. HistoryThe Man Who Predicted 9/11Mankind DecodedMankind The Story of All of UsMansonMarijuana: A Chronic HistoryMarkedMavericks, Miracles & MedicineMega DisastersMega MoversThe Men Who Killed KennedyThe Miracle of Stairway BMissing in AlaskaMonsterQuestMoon ShotMore Extreme MarksmenMore Sex in the Civil WarThe MostMotorheadsMounted in AlaskaMovies in TimeMud MenMysteryQuestNazi America: A Secret HistoryNazi TitanicThe Next Big BangNight ClassNixon: The Arrogance of PowerNixon: A Presidency RevealedNostradamus EffectThe Obama Years a Nine-part oral historyMillion Dollar ManhuntOnly in America with Larry the Cable GuyOur CenturyOzzy & Jack's World DetourPatton 360Pearl Harbor: 24 Hours AfterPearl Harbor: The TruthThe People SpeakThe PlaguePower & IcePredator XPresidential PropheciesThe PresidentsThe President's Book of SecretsQuest for King ArthurRats, Bats & BugsReal DealThe Real Face of Jesus?The Real Scorpion KingThe Real Story of ChristmasThe Real Story of HalloweenThe Real Story of ThanksgivingThe Real WestReel to RealReturn of the PiratesRevealed: The Hunt for Bin LadenRevelation: The End of DaysRise and Fall of the Berlin WallRise Up: The Movement that Changed AmericaRoanoke: Search for the Lost ColonyRome: Engineering an EmpireRome: Rise and Fall of an EmpireRommelRonald ReaganRonald Reagan: A Legacy RememberedRussia, Land of the TsarsSaharaThe St. Valentine's Day MassacreSandhogsSave Our HistorySecret Access: Air Force OneSecret SocietiesSecrets of ChristianitySecrets of the Founding FathersThe Selection: Special Operations ExperimentSeven Deadly SinsSex in the Ancient WorldShadow ForceShark WranglersSharp ShootersSiberia: How the East Was WonSherman's MarchShockwaveShootout!SlicedSmartest Guy In The RoomSniper: Inside the CrosshairsSold!Spy WebStan Lee's SuperhumansStar Trek: Beyond the Final FrontierStar Wars: The Legacy RevealedStar Wars TechThe StatesThe Story Of Anthony Adegoke: The LegendStreet Gangs: A Secret HistoryStrip the CityStrip the CosmosThe Strongest Man in HistoryStyle IconSuicide MissionsSuperhumanSurviving HistorySwamp PeopleSworn to SecrecyTactical to PracticalTales of the GunTargetedTech EffectTech ForceThe Ten CommandmentsThat's ImpossibleTHC classroomTHINGAMABOBThird Reich: The FallThird Reich: The RiseThis Week in History (2000–2002)Time MachineTitanic at 100: Mystery SolvedTitanic's Final Moments: Missing PiecesTitanic's Tragic SisterTo the Best of My AbilityTop Gear (American TV series)Top ShotTora, Tora, Tora: The Real Story of Pearl HarborTougher in AlaskaTR - An American LionTrains UnlimitedTrial by FireTrue Action AdventuresTrue Caribbean PiratesThe True Story of Alexander the GreatThe True Story of HannibalTulsa Burning: The 1921 Race MassacreTuskegee Airmen: Legacy of CourageUFO FilesUFO HuntersUnderwater UniverseUnforgettablesUnidentified: Inside America's UFO InvestigationUnited  of AmericaThe UniverseUnsung Heroes of Pearl HarborValkyrie: The Plot to Kill HitlerVanishingsVietnam in HDVoices From Inside the TowersWarrior Queen BoudicaWarriorsWatergateWe Can Make You TalkWeapons at WarWeird U.S.Weird WarfareWhat's the Earth Worth?Where Did It Come From?The White House: Behind Closed DoorsWho Wrote the BibleWild West TechWitch HuntWoodstockThe WorksThe World Trade Center: Rise and Fall of an American IconWorld War II From SpaceWWII in HDThe XY FactorYear-By-YearYou Don't Know DixieZero Hour''

Notes

References

External links

History